The Kent Museum of Freemasonry, is a museum in St Peters Place, Canterbury, Kent with  a rare collection of masonic exhibits of national and international importance.

It tells the history of Freemasonry from its inception through to the modern day, which emphasis on Kent, its Lodges and their origins and has possibly the finest collection of Masonic material in the UK outside London. This includes the unique 19th-century stained glass windows which originally adorned the old Freemasons’ Hall in London.

Introduction
Open to all and located in the heart of Canterbury's tourist route, the Kent Museum of Freemasonry is a five-minute stroll from Canterbury Cathedral and close to the Westgate Towers.

The Canterbury museum hosts a rare collection of masonic artefacts and ephemera of national and international interest.
 
There are items of interest to both the curious browser and serious student of Freemasonry including many with anthropological links to the City of Canterbury and the County of Kent.  The collection includes a fine collection of Masonic paintings, unique glassware and porcelain, along with documents and presentation items. The extensive collection of masonic manuscripts, regalia and books covers all Masonic orders through the ages. 
 
Visitors will find a comprehensive history of Freemasonry, from its inception through to the present time, with special emphasis on Kent and both of its modern-day administrators The Masonic Province of East Kent and The Masonic Province of West Kent. 
 
Although situated in Canterbury which is masonically administered by the Province of East Kent, the Kent Museum of Freemasonry is a Charitable Incorporated Organisation, registered under Charity No. 1163887 the management of which is in the hands of a separate charitable trust.

History
The history of the Kent Museum of Freemasonry can be traced to the latter end of the 19th century. 
 
Speculative masonry has been present in Canterbury since 1730 when the city’s first lodge began meeting at the Red Lion Tavern which adjoined the old Guildhall in the High Street. According to Lanes Masonic record 1717–1894, three private and six military lodges were consecrated in the city.  In 1878 the Canterbury lodges, that until then had met in different public houses in the city such as the Kings Head and Brewers Arms, joined together to purchase their  own premises near to the Westgate Towers at 38 St Peter's Street. It was in the garden of this building that the Canterbury masonic temple was subsequently constructed in 1880.
 
Over the years the separate lodges acquired and inherited many contemporary and historic masonic artefacts and ephemera. Once the temple was established these were all brought together in the lodge of instruction room at the rear of the building. As the collection continued to grow, space became an ongoing problem.
 
In 1919 the East Kent Masters Lodge No.3931 was consecrated in Canterbury and its first Master was Wykeham Stanley Cornwallis, 2nd Baron Cornwallis, the Provincial Grand Master of the time. After seeing the growing collection of masonic artefacts and books, he conceived the idea of the Kent Provincial Library & Museum. Both Maidstone – the County town and location of the Provincial office and Bromley – the home of a large number of lodges, were considered as suitable places. However the Provincial Grand Master decided that Canterbury would be the location.
 
It was not long before the Provincial minutes show that an appeal was set up to raise funds "to house", as the Provincial Grand Master put it, "the many treasures that lodges, the Province and its private members had collected over the years for all to see". He also wanted them to remain in masonic care.

1920 saw the Province of Kent form a fundraising committee under the chairmanship of W.H. East of Dover, supported by secretary H.C. Page and treasurer H. Biggleston, both of Canterbury.  Over the next five years the Provincial minutes acknowledge the receipt of many gifts from lodges and the appeal fund, "doing well", but without the mention of specific totals.  However, in 1925 the accounts of the Province showed the sum of £1,036 4s 11d being paid to Bro. Edward Dean of St Augustine's Lodge No. 972  for the purchase of the garden of 34 St Peters Street, Canterbury for the Library & Museum at Canterbury.
  
In 1930 an architect, Bro. F.G. Haywood of Market Square, Dover, was appointed to plan and oversee the construction of the building. The main contractors were W.W. Martin of Ramsgate and  G.H. Denne & Son of Walmer. The Provincial Grand Master, The Lord Cornwallis, was by this time also the Deputy Grand Master of the United Grand Lodge of England and when the old Grand Library and Museum in Great Queen Street, London was demolished to make room for the new Grand Temple and Connaught Rooms, he acquired the stained glass windows, internal doors and most of the showcases for Canterbury.
 
The solid oak entrance doors were donated by a Worshipful Bro. Jimmy Edwards and came from St Mary’s College, part of the Jesuit house in Hales Place, Canterbury, which was also being demolished at the time.
 
June 1932 saw the building completed and £2,900 was paid to the contractors from the Province’s general fund.  The total cost including the land is recorded as £3,936 4s 11d.
 
The Kent Library & Museum of Freemasonry was officially opened by the Provincial Grand Master on 19 April 1933.
 
The collection has continued to grow and now boasts more than 3,000 pieces of masonic paintings, literature, regalia, glassware and ceramics.
 
In 1993 the Kent Masonic Library and Museum Trust became a registered charity No.1018784.

The museum closed to the public in early 2011 for an extensive redevelopment, eventually reopening in September 2012 in a new walk through format, which tells the history of Freemasonry from its inception through to the modern day, which emphasis on Kent, its Lodges and their origins. Displays include information on famous Kent Masons, Masonic military heroes and other masonic orders.

Visitor information
The museum is usually open from 10.00am to 4.00pm every day except for the Christmas and new year period.

It is situated between Canterbury East & West railway stations, with ample public car parking nearby, both on road and in Pound Lane.

Wheelchair access is available throughout.

Admission is free of charge.

References

Bibliography
Gahan, RFW (1994) A Short History of the Kent Masonic Library and Museum

External links
 East Kent Freemasons
 Masonic Province of West Kent
 

History of Canterbury
Museums in Canterbury
Museums established in 1933
Local museums in Kent
Masonic museums
1933 establishments in England
Freemasonry in England